The 2020–21 North Alabama Lions women's basketball team represented University of North Alabama during the 2020–21 NCAA Division I women's basketball season. They were led by head coach Missy Tiber in her eighth season at North Alabama. The Lions played their home games at the Flowers Hall in Florence, Alabama as members of the Atlantic Sun Conference.

This was North Alabama's third of a four-year transition period from Division II to Division I. As a result, the Lions were not eligible for NCAA postseason play but participated in the ASUN Tournament losing in the quarterfinals.

Previous season
The Lions finished the 2019–20 season 21-9, 11-5 to finish tied in second place in ASUN play. They advanced to the semifinals of the conference tournament before losing in overtime to Liberty.

References

North Alabama Lions
North Alabama Lions women's basketball seasons
North Alabama Lions women's basketball
North Alabama Lions women's basketball